Ade Raga Ade Hadu is 1989 Indian Kannada-language horror film directed by M. S. Rajashekar and produced by S. A. Govindaraj. The film stars Shiva Rajkumar and Seema, a debutant, along with Srinath and Thoogudeepa Srinivas.

Plot
The story starts with Chandu and his friends, who are pursuing MBBS degree, they challenge Sangeetha for her tomboyish attitude. Gradually, Sangeetha starts loving Chandu. Both Chandu and Sangeetha plan to get married with the blessing of their parents. As preparations for marriage are on the way, Sangeetha starts to behave strangely and antagonistic towards Chandu, who is attacked by a ghost during Anatomy class in her college. Though Chandu is perplexed by her behaviour, He follows Sangeetha one day going to an old bungalow and recognizes the ghost from a photo of an old lady who had previously cursed him.

Chandu learns the story of the old lady from another woman, friend of old lady, who reveals (through a flashback) that she was once a rich lady, whose daughter, Deepa, had fallen in love with a poor man, Nanda; in a fit of rage, Deepa is beaten by her mother and warned to avoid him due to status issues, also sends goons to attack Nanda also; Deepa fleas to be with her lover, but her mother kills the lovers by burning down Nanda's house without knowing Deepa's presence with him. In a turn of events, the old lady turns mentally unstable, loses all her wealth and finally dies in a car accident.

After hearing this, Chandu realizes that he and Sangeetha are the recantation of the ill-fated lovers and Deepa's mother now possesses Sangeetha's body and is trying to kill Chandu. The story that follows is the attempts of Chandu to save Deepa's life from the ill-attempts of the ghost and finally saving her from the clutches of the ghost.

Cast
Shiva Rajkumar as Chandru / Nanda
Seema as Sangeetha / Deepa
Srinath
Thoogudeepa Srinivas
Shivakumar
Pramila Joshai
Girija Lokesh
Sundarashree
Mico Kitty
Go Ra Bheema Rao
Gopalakrishna
Srishailan
Karanth
Chikkanna
Kunigal Ramanath
Kannada Raju

Soundtrack
The film's original score and soundtrack was composed by Shankar–Ganesh and the audio was sold on Sangeetha label.

References

1989 horror films
1989 films
Indian ghost films
Indian romantic horror films
1980s Kannada-language films
Films scored by Shankar–Ganesh
Films about reincarnation
Films directed by M. S. Rajashekar
1980s romance films